Besfort Zeneli (born 21 November 2002) is a Kosovan professional footballer who plays as a midfielder for Allsvenskan club IF Elfsborg.

Club career
On 6 January 2022, Zeneli signed his first professional contract with Allsvenskan side IF Elfsborg after agreeing to a two-year deal. On 21 July 2022, he was named as a IF Elfsborg substitute for the first time in a 2022–23 UEFA Europa Conference League second qualifying round against Molde. His debut with IF Elfsborg came seven days later in the 2022–23 UEFA Europa Conference League second qualifying round again against Molde after coming on as a substitute at 73rd minute in place of Michael Baidoo. On 11 September 2022, Zeneli made his league debut in a 2–0 away win against GIF Sundsvall after coming on as a substitute at last minutes again in place of Michael Baidoo.

International career
Zeneli is eligible to represent two countries on international level, either Sweden or Kosovo. On 18 October 2021, Zeneli declared through an interview for Koha Ditore that he is waiting for a call-up from Football Federation of Kosovo to represent Kosovo at the under-21 level and that he had refused to represent Sweden at the youth level even though he had the opportunity to choose. On 15 September 2022, Zeneli received a call-up from Kosovo U21 for a training camp held in Antalya, Turkey and for the hybrid friendly match against Greenland.

Personal life
Born and raised in Sweden, Zeneli is of Kosovo Albanian origin from Selac, a village near Mitrovica. He is the younger brother of Kosovo international Arbër Zeneli.

References

External links

2002 births
Living people
Association football midfielders
Swedish men's footballers
Swedish people of Kosovan descent
Swedish people of Albanian descent
Kosovan men's footballers
Allsvenskan players
IF Elfsborg players